is a railway station on the Sekisho Line in Yuni, Yūfutsu District, Hokkaido, Japan, operated by Hokkaido Railway Company (JR Hokkaido).

Lines
Kawabata Station is served by the Sekisho Line, and is situated 27.0 km from the starting point of the line at Minami-Chitose Station. The station is numbered "K17".

Station layout
The station has one side platform and one island platform connected by a footbridge, serving three tracks. Kitaca is not available. The station is unattended.

History
The station opened on 1 August 1893. With the privatization of Japanese National Railways (JNR) on 1 April 1987, the station came under the control of JR Hokkaido.

See also
 List of railway stations in Japan

References

Railway stations in Hokkaido Prefecture
Railway stations in Japan opened in 1893